Höör Municipality (Höörs kommun) is a municipality in the central part of Skåne County in southern Sweden. Its seat is located in the town of Höör.

The present municipality was formed in 1969 through the merger of "old" Höör with the municipalities of Norra Frosta, Snogeröd  and Tjörnarp parish from the dissolved Sösdala Municipality.

Geography 

Höör Municipality credits itself by being different from the rest of Scania: Apart from agricultural areas, Höör Municipality also has several forests and the lake Ringsjön. Ringsjön is the second largest lake in Skåne County and covers some 40 km², about three times the size of the town of Höör.

The two main attractions of the municipality that draw visitors  are the zoological garden Skånes Djurpark, and the Bosjökloster Castle established in the 12th century. The castle is situated in a scenic location in a cape in the lake Ringsjön; the zoological garden is situated just north of the town of Höör.

Sights in the town proper are few in the little town with its 7,000 inhabitants, but it has a large 12th-century church, with a north transept from 1769 (an unusual date for Skåne churches) and a 19th-century tower, along with some picturesque older houses. A peaceful place, the typical Höör house is one or two storeys tall, with no large streets. Adding to the picturesque image are two centrally located small ponds with densely foliaged trees and bushes surrounding them, which increases in thickness until they unite with the forests surrounding the town.

Localities 
There are six localities in the municipality.
Population as of December 31, 2005.

A small part of Löberöd is also within Höör Municipality.

Parish churches 

From January 1, 2006 Höör Municipality contains two parishes, Höör parish, incorporating the old parishes Hallaröd, Höör, Norra Rörum, and Munkarp, and parts of Ringsjö parish (the old parishes Bosjökloster and Gudmuntorp).  Ringsjö parish also includes the old Hurva parish, which is in Eslöv Municipality. There are thus six former parish churches:
 Bosjökloster (12th century Romanesque, former abbey church, by Bosjökloster Castle)
 Gudmuntorp (1860, replacing 12th-century church)
 Hallaröd (late 12th century Romanesque, extended in the 19th century, late Gothic chalk paintings)
 Höör (late 12th century Romanesque, 19th-century tower, important Romanesque baptismal font)
 Norra Rörum (ca 1200, Romanesque, separate 18th century steeple, large burial chapel from the 1770s)
 Munkarp (1884, but contains baptismal font and pulpit from older church)

International relations

Twin towns — Sister cities
The municipality is twinned with:

 Stevns Municipality in Denmark 
 Soini in Finland 
 Città di Castello in Italy

References

External links 

 Höör - Official site
 Coat of arms
 Bosjökloster Castle
  Ringsjon.se - Project Ringsjön

Municipalities of Skåne County